Head of a Female Saint is an undated oil on panel painting by Cima da Conegliano, now in the Museo Poldi Pezzoli in Milan. It depicts an unknown female saint, since there are no visible attributes that can help to her identification.

External links

Paintings by Cima da Conegliano
Paintings in the collection of the Museo Poldi Pezzoli